Rear Admiral Ravindra Jayant Nadkarni, AVSM, VSM is a former flag officer in the Indian Navy.  He last served as the Flag Officer Defence Advisory Group (FODAG).

Early life
Nadkarni was born to Admiral Jayant Ganpat Nadkarni, an officer in the Indian Navy who rose to become the 12th Chief of the Naval Staff, and Vimal Nadkarni.

Education
Nadkarni did his undergraduate studies at the National Defence Academy, Khadakvasla. He went on to graduate from the staff course at the Defence Services Staff College in Wellington. He also attended the College of Naval Warfare in Karanja and the National Defence College in New Delhi.

Career
He was commissioned in the Indian Navy on 1 July 1983. As a lieutenant, he commanded a Coast Guard interceptor boat CGS C-05. As a lieutenant commander, he commanded a minesweeper INS Cuddalore. Later, as a commander, he commanded the frigate . The last ship he commanded was as a captain, INS Betwa. From 15 October 2016 to 10 January 2020, he was the chief of staff of the Southern Naval Command, which is the training command of the Indian Navy.

Military awards and aecorations
Nadkarni was a recipient of the Vishisht Seva Medal in 2014 and the Ati Vishist Seva Medal in 2019.

References

Indian Navy admirals
Recipients of the Vishisht Seva Medal
Year of birth missing (living people)
Living people
Defence Services Staff College alumni
National Defence College, India alumni